The 2009 Austrian Figure Skating Championships took place between 12 and 14 December 2008 at the EisArena in Linz. Skaters competed in the disciplines of men's singles, ladies' singles, and ice dancing on the senior level. The results were used to choose the Austrian teams to the 2009 World Championships and the 2009 European Championships.

The Junior Championships were held immediately prior to the Senior championships in the same location and arena, between 10 and 12 December.

The senior and junior compulsory dance was the Paso Doble.

Senior results

Men

Ladies

Ice dancing

Junior results

Men

Ladies

Ice dancing

External links
 2009 Austrian Figure Skating Championships 
 2009 Austrian Championships results
 2009 Austrian Junior Championships results
 

Austrian Figure Skating Championships
2008 in figure skating
Austrian Figure Skating Championships, 2009
Figure skating